Timothy Edward Lee Hague (May 9, 1983 – June 18, 2017) was a Canadian mixed martial artist and boxer who competed in the heavyweight division, most recently for Absolute Championship Berkut. He became a professional fighter in 2006, and formerly competed for the Ultimate Fighting Championship, World Series of Fighting and King of the Cage, where he went 11–0 and was the King of the Cage Canada Heavyweight Champion. On June 16, 2017, he suffered a brain hemorrhage after being knocked out in a boxing match against Adam Braidwood in Edmonton, Alberta. He died on June 18, 2017.

Biography
Hague had a Bachelor of Arts from Augustana University College and an Elementary Education degree from the University of Alberta. Prior to beginning his MMA career, he was an elementary school teacher at École Bellevue School in Beaumont, Alberta. Hague died on June 18, 2017, after suffering a brain injury in a match with former Canadian Football League (CFL) defensive end Adam Braidwood.

Mixed martial arts career

Early career
Hague made his MMA debut against Eric MacDonald at King Of The Cage Canada: Detonator in 2006. Hague came out victorious winning via submission. Hague went on to win his next 3 fights and subsequently won the vacant KOTC Canada heavyweight title over Adriano Bernardo in only his fifth fight. His only loss came to Miodrag Petkovic in a split decision. Before signing with Ultimate Fighting Championship, Hague got a rematch against Petkovic and won by unanimous decision.

Ultimate Fighting Championship
Hague made his debut against former professional kickboxer, Pat Barry at UFC 98. Hague upset Barry by submitting him using a guillotine choke early in the first round.

Hague fought Todd Duffee on the UFC 102 preliminary card on August 29, 2009. Heavyweight Todd Duffee scored, what was then the fastest official KO in UFC history over Hague at 0:07 into the fight.
In his fight against Chris Tuchscherer on February 6, 2010, at UFC 109, Hague lost a controversial majority decision after 3 rounds (29–28, 29–28, and 28–28). Joe Rogan said that it may have been the worst decision he had ever seen in his entire life. Following his loss to Tuchscherer, Hague was released from the promotion.

UFC Return
On April 21, 2010, it was reported that Chad Corvin had pulled out of his UFC 113 bout against Joey Beltran due to his medical paperwork not being approved by the Quebec Athletic Commission, and Hague had been selected to step in. Hague faced Beltran on the preliminary card of the May 8 event and lost via unanimous decision (30–27, 30–26, and 29–28).

Hague faced Matt Mitrione on January 22, 2011, at UFC Fight Night 23. He lost the fight via TKO due to punches in the first round. He was then released from the UFC with a promotional record of 1–4.

The Fight Club
Shortly after being released from his UFC contract, Hague signed a multi-fight deal with Edmonton, Alberta-based promotion The Fight Club. His first fight was scheduled to be on March 19 at TFC 10, against Tyler East. East, however, was forced to withdraw and Ed Carpenter was named as his replacement. Carpenter was then sent to the hospital with an undisclosed medical issue an hour prior to the event.

Regional promotions
On July 9, 2010, Hague faced Ultimate Fighter Season 10 veteran Zak Jensen at AMMA 4: Victory, and won via KO due to knees in the first round.

Hague then faced fellow UFC vet, Travis Wiuff, at AMMA 5: Uprising on October 1, 2010, event in Edmonton, Alberta. He won the fight via Knockout in the first round.

Hague made a valiant 3 Full Round effort against Mike Hackert facing a loss in Fort McMurray, Alberta. Following this loss he went back to the drawing board, took a vacation to Mexico with friend and fellow fighter Spencer Hendricks, and came back with a mindset to get himself UFC bound. Hague then rematched Hackert at the Mayfield Trade Center for the #1 Canadian Heavyweight Ranking. Facing a first-round TKO, Hague announced his retirement from MMA following the bout.

In March 2013, Hague announced his return to the cage. He fought former UFC middleweight Kalib Starnes at Aggression Fighting Championship 19 in Edmonton, Alberta on July 5, 2013. He lost the fight via unanimous decision.

Hague faced Smealinho Rama on May 23, 2014, in Edmonton, Alberta for the Unified MMA promotion. He lost via TKO in the first round.

Hague faced Dwayne Lewis on September 19, 2014, in Fort McMurray, Alberta at Prestige Fighting Championship 6. He won the fight via KO in the first round.

Hague faced to Evgeny Erokhin on August 29, 2015, at League S-70: Russia vs. World. He lost via knockout.

World Series of Fighting
Hague made his World Series of Fighting debut against Lee Mein on February 21, 2014, at WSOF Canada 1. He won the fight via TKO in the first round.

Hague faced Matt Baker on June 7, 2014, at WSOF Canada 2. He won the fight via TKO in the first round.

Hague faced Craig Hudson on October 11, 2014, at WSOF 14 in a rematch where Hague was previously victorious. He won the fight via TKO in the third round.

Absolute Championship Berkut
In his final MMA fight, Hague was quickly knocked out by a head kick from Michał Andryszak at ACB 41.

Boxing and death
Hague made his boxing debut on December 9, 2011, knocking out Patrick Graham in the Shaw Conference Centre in Edmonton. After a hiatus, he returned to the venue twice in 2016, dropping a unanimous decision to Stan Ahumada in September and losing by TKO to Mladen Miljas that December. Hague was removed from life support and died on June 18, 2017, of injuries sustained during a boxing match at the Shaw Conference Centre on June 16, 2017 at Edmonton, Canada with Adam Braidwood. He was 34 years old at the time of his death. His death triggered the Edmonton city council to pass a new law to impose a ban of one year on combat sports in Edmonton. On January 23, 2018, the ban was lifted.

Championships and accomplishments
King of the Cage
KOTC Canada Heavyweight Championship (One time)

Unified MMA
Unified MMA Heavyweight Championship (One time)

Mixed martial arts record
Source:

|-
|Loss
|align=center|21–13
|Michał Andryszak
|TKO (head kick and punches)
|Absolute Championship Berkut 41
|
|align=center|1
|align=center|0:33
|Sochi, Russia
|
|-
|Win
|align=center|21–12
|Kalib Starnes
|TKO (leg kicks)
|XFFC 9: Conviction
|
|align=center|4
|align=center|0:13
|Grande Prairie, Alberta, Canada
|
|-
|Loss
|align=center|20–12
|Tanner Boser
|KO (elbows)
|Unified MMA 26
|
|align=center|2
|align=center|2:30
|Edmonton, Alberta, Canada
|
|-
|Loss
|align=center|20–11
|Tony Lopez
|KO (head kick and punches)
|Unified MMA 25
|
|align=center|3
|align=center|3:24
|Edmonton, Alberta, Canada
|
|-
|Loss
|align=center|20–10
|Evgeny Erokhin
|KO (punch)
|League S-70: Russia vs. World
|
|align=center|1
|align=center|3:05
|Sochi, Krasnodar krai, Russia
|
|-
|Win
|align=center|20–9
|Tanner Boser
|KO (punches)
|Unified MMA 22
|
|align=center|1
|align=center|0:06
|Edmonton, Alberta, Canada
|
|-
|Win
|align=center|19–9
|Craig Hudson
|TKO (punches)
|WSOF 14
|
|align=center|3
|align=center|2:55
|Edmonton, Alberta, Canada
|
|-
|Win
|align=center|18–9
|Dwayne Lewis
|KO (punch)
|Prestige FC 6
|
|align=center|1
|align=center|3:09
|Fort McMurray, Alberta, Canada
|
|-
|Win
|align=center| 17–9
|Matt Baker
|TKO (punches)
|WSOF Canada 2
| 
|align=center| 1
|align=center| 3:56
|Edmonton, Alberta, Canada
|
|-
|Loss
|align=center|16–9
|Smealinho Rama
|TKO (punches)
|Unified MMA 19
|
|align=center|1
|align=center|1:41
|Edmonton, Alberta, Canada
|
|-
|Win
|align=center|16–8
|Lee Mein
|TKO (punches)
|WSOF Canada 1
|
|align=center|1
|align=center|4:21
|Edmonton, Alberta, Canada
|
|-
|Loss
|align=center|15–8
|Kalib Starnes
|Decision (unanimous)
|AFC 19: Undisputed
|
|align=center|3
|align=center|5:00
|Edmonton, Alberta, Canada
|
|-
|Win
|align=center|15–7
|Jordan Tracey
|TKO (punches)
|KOTC: Earthquake
|
|align=center|1
|align=center|2:25
|Edmonton, Alberta, Canada
|
|-
|Loss
|align=center|14–7
|Mike Hackert
|TKO (punches)
|MFC 34
|
|align=center|1
|align=center|2:27
|Edmonton, Canada, Canada
|
|-
|Loss
|align=center|14–6
|Mike Hackert
|Decision (unanimous)
|Prestige FC 4
|
|align=center|3
|align=center|5:00
|Fort McMurray, Canada
|
|-
|Win
|align=center|14–5
|Craig Hudson
|KO (punch)
|KOTC: Unified
|
|align=center|1
|align=center|2:06
|Grande Prairie, Alberta Canada
|
|-
|Win
|align=center|13–5
|Vince Lucero
|Submission (guillotine choke)
|AMMA 8: Unfinished Business
|
|align=center|1
|align=center|1:14
|Edmonton, Alberta Canada
|
|-
|Loss
|align=center|12–5
|Matt Mitrione
|TKO (punches)
|UFC Fight Night 23
|
|align=center|1
|align=center|2:59
|Fort Hood, Texas, United States
|
|-
|Win
|align=center|12–4
|Travis Wiuff
|KO (punch)
|AMMA 5: Uprising
|
|align=center|1
|align=center|1:50
|Edmonton, Alberta, Canada
|
|-
|Win
|align=center|11–4
|Zak Jensen
|KO (knee)
|AMMA 4: Victory
|
|align=center|1
|align=center|2:11
|Edmonton, Alberta, Canada
|
|-
|Loss
|align=center|10–4
|Joey Beltran
|Decision (unanimous)
|UFC 113
|
|align=center|3
|align=center|5:00
|Montreal, Quebec, Canada
|
|-
|Loss
|align=center|10–3
|Chris Tuchscherer
|Decision (majority)
|UFC 109
|
|align=center|3
|align=center|5:00
|Las Vegas, Nevada, United States
|
|-
|Loss
|align=center|10–2
|Todd Duffee
|KO (punches)
|UFC 102
|
|align=center|1
|align=center|0:07
|Portland, Oregon, United States
|
|-
|Win
|align=center|10–1
|Pat Barry
|Submission (guillotine choke)
|UFC 98
|
|align=center|1
|align=center|1:42
|Las Vegas, Nevada, United States
|
|-
|Win
|align=center|9–1
|Miodrag Petković
|Decision (unanimous)
|Raw Combat: Redemption
|
|align=center|3
|align=center|5:00
|Calgary, Alberta, Canada
|
|-
|Win
|align=center|8–1
|Sherman Pendergarst
|TKO (strikes)
|KOTC Canada: Unrefined
|
|align=center|2
|align=center|N/A
|Edmonton, Alberta, Canada
|
|-
|Win
|align=center|7–1
|Jeff Lundburg
|KO (punches)
|KOTC Canada: Moment de Vérité
|
|align=center|1
|align=center|N/A
|Montreal, Quebec, Canada
|
|-
|Win
|align=center|6–1
|Jared Kilkenny
|KO (punch)
|KOTC Canada: Brawl in the Mall 3
|
|align=center|1
|align=center|0:09
|Edmonton, Alberta, Canada
|
|-
|Loss
|align=center|5–1
|Miodrag Petković
|Decision (split)
|Hardcore Championship Fighting: Destiny
|
|align=center|3
|align=center|5:00
|Calgary, Alberta, Canada
|
|-
|Win
|align=center|5–0
|Adriano Bernardo
|TKO (doctor stoppage)
|KOTC Canada: Brawl in the Mall
|
|align=center|2
|align=center|3:49
|Edmonton, Alberta, Canada
|
|-
|Win
|align=center|4–0
|Ruben Villareal
|Decision (unanimous)
|KOTC: Megiddo
|
|align=center|3
|align=center|5:00
|Vernon, British Columbia, Canada
|
|-
|Win
|align=center|3–0
|Jared Kilkenny
|TKO (punches)
|KOTC Canada: Amplified
|
|align=center|2
|align=center|0:31
|Edmonton, Alberta, Canada
|
|-
|Win
|align=center|2–0
|Jessie Jones
|Submission (verbal)
|KOTC Canada: Icebreaker
|
|align=center|1
|align=center|3:12
|Prince George, British Columbia, Canada
|
|-
|Win
|align=center|1–0
|Eric Macdonald
|Submission (guillotine choke)
|KOTC Canada: Detonator
|
|align=center|2
|align=center|N/A
|Calgary, Alberta, Canada
|
|-

Professional boxing record

References

External links

1983 births
2017 deaths
University of Alberta alumni
Canadian male mixed martial artists
Heavyweight mixed martial artists
Mixed martial artists utilizing boxing
Mixed martial artists utilizing wrestling
Mixed martial artists utilizing Brazilian jiu-jitsu
Canadian practitioners of Brazilian jiu-jitsu
Canadian male boxers
Deaths due to injuries sustained in boxing
Sport deaths in Canada
Filmed deaths in sports
Ultimate Fighting Championship male fighters